The Department of Aerospace Development (DDA) is a government body in Ecuador responsible for the development of its civil space program. It is part of the Ecuadorian Air Force (SAF).

Organisation
The DDA has contributed to the construction of the G-Force Condor. Currently it is working with other institutions for the construction of a tall aerospace platform that will aid in national aerospace development.

External links
Fuerza Aérea Ecuatoriana Web Site (Spanish)
www.midena.gov.ec

Science and technology in Ecuador